Oksana (Pasha) Vladimirovna Grishuk (born 17 March 1971) is a Russian former competitive ice dancer. She is best known for her partnership with Evgeni Platov from 1989 to 1998. With Platov, she is a two-time Olympic champion (1994, 1998), four-time World champion (1994–1997), and three-time European champion (1996–1998). With previous partner Alexandr Chichkov, she is the 1988 World Junior champion.

Personal life 
The skater's name is most commonly romanized as Oksana Grishuk but other variations exist. The Cyrillic shcha ("щ") may be transliterated as 'sh' to reflect modern Russian pronunciation or, alternatively, as 'shch' (scholarly šč) to reflect the older pronunciation, which is still common in Ukrainian. In the early 1990s, her surname sometimes appeared erroneously as Gritschuk.

Grishuk was born in Odessa, Ukrainian SSR, Soviet Union. Her father abandoned the family before she was one. Her mother was an economic engineer. They moved to Moscow in 1980. 

Grishuk studied at the Sport University of Moscow from 1988 to 1992. She moved from Moscow to Newark, Delaware in 1994 and then to Marlborough, Massachusetts in 1996. She currently resides in Los Angeles, California with her daughter, Skyler Marie Grace Grishuk.

Career 
Grishuk began skating at the age of four. After moving to Moscow, she was turned away by several clubs before a coach finally accepted her. She began training under Natalia Linichuk at the age of 12. Grishuk initially competed with Alexandr Chichkov for the Soviet Union. In 1987, they won the silver medal at the World Junior Championships. The following year, they won gold at the event, as well as the Soviet Championships. They competed one more season and won bronze at the Grand Prix International de Paris (now known as Trophée Eric Bompard). He retired in the summer of 1989 due to injury.

Grishuk was invited to join Natalia Dubova's group where she was partnered with Evgeni Platov. They trained in Moscow. Three months later, in December 1989, they won the bronze medal at the Soviet Championships. They were fifth in their World Championship debut in 1990. Their first European and World medals, both bronze, came at the 1992 European Championships and 1992 World Championships.

Due to tensions between Grishuk and Maya Usova in the summer of 1992, Grishuk left the group. Dubova found a new partner for Platov while Grishuk briefly searched for a new partner in Germany before returning to Moscow and her previous coach, Natalia Linichuk. Platov decided not to follow Dubova and re-teamed with Grishuk in the fall of 1992.

During the 1992–93 season, Grishuk and Platov won European and World silver medals. In 1993–94, they won silver at the European Championships. They won their first Olympic title at the 1994 Olympics. They ended the season with their first World title at the 1994 World Championships. They then left Russia and moved with Linichuk to Newark, Delaware for better training and living conditions.

Grishuk and Platov missed most of 1994–95 due to injury but returned to win the 1995 World Championships. They had a full season in 1995–96 and won another set of European and World titles.

In 1996, Grishuk and Platov split from Linichuk and moved to Tatiana Tarasova in Marlborough, Massachusetts. Injury kept them out of competition in the first half of the 1996–97 season but they returned to win their second European and fourth World title. In September 1997, she changed her first name to Pasha after being repeatedly confused with Oksana Baiul, but later went back to Oksana. In 1997–98, Grishuk and Platov won their third European Championships. At the event, they were slashed in a practice collision with Anjelika Krylova and Oleg Ovsiannikov but were not seriously hurt and both teams said it was an accident. Grishuk and Platov competed at their third Olympics in 1998 in Nagano, where they became the first ice dancers to repeat as gold medalists.

Grishuk and Platov won 20 consecutive competitions from 1994 to 1998. They were entered in the Guinness Book of World Records in 1998 for becoming the only team in the history of ice dancing to win Olympic gold twice. Grishuk and Platov combined speed and difficult elements, and displayed their mastery of numerous styles of dance. On their partnership, Platov said in 1998: "It's like being a husband and a wife. Sometimes, you fight. Sometimes, you walk away and calm down. I met her a long time ago, and I still remember her as a little girl on the ice. She was so little. So active. Usually, little girls are boring. But that girl. Oh, there was a fire on ice." He also said: "It's hard to change her mind. She fights every step. But it works out. That's why she is so good."

Grishuk and Platov retired from competition and did not compete at the 1998 World Championships. They skated together in shows until the summer of 1998. Platov then decided to skate with their former rival Maya Usova. Grishuk teamed up with Alexander Zhulin with whom she skated one year. She also appeared in Cinderella and Nutcracker shows as a solo skater and with partners.

In 1994, Russian President Boris Yeltsin awarded Grishuk with a government medal of Friendship for highest achievement in sport. In 1998, Yeltsin awarded Grishuk with a government medal of Labor also for highest achievement in sport.

In 2006, Grishuk was a celebrity judge on the WE tv series Skating's Next Star, created and produced by Major League Figure Skating and hosted by Kristi Yamaguchi. Also in 2006, Grishuk won Dance on Ice, a Russian celebrity skating show in Moscow, and was third in 2007. Grishuk and Platov reunited in February 2008 in Nagano, Japan for their ten-year anniversary of winning the 1998 Olympic gold medal.

Grishuk coaches at the KHS Arena in Anaheim, California.

Programs 
(with Platov)

(with Zhulin)

Results

With Platov

With Chichkov

References

External links 

 

1971 births
Living people
Russian female ice dancers
Soviet female ice dancers
Olympic figure skaters of the Unified Team
Olympic figure skaters of Russia
Figure skaters at the 1992 Winter Olympics
Figure skaters at the 1994 Winter Olympics
Figure skaters at the 1998 Winter Olympics
Olympic gold medalists for Russia
Sportspeople from Odesa
Russian people of Ukrainian descent
Olympic medalists in figure skating
World Figure Skating Championships medalists
European Figure Skating Championships medalists
World Junior Figure Skating Championships medalists
Medalists at the 1998 Winter Olympics
Medalists at the 1994 Winter Olympics
Competitors at the 1990 Goodwill Games